Bucculatrix viguierae is a moth in the family Bucculatricidae. It is found in North America, where it has been recorded from New Mexico, Arizona and California. It was first described by Annette Frances Braun in 1962.

Adults have been recorded on wing in April, September and November.

References

Natural History Museum Lepidoptera generic names catalog

Bucculatricidae
Moths described in 1962
Moths of North America
Taxa named by Annette Frances Braun